is a Japanese voice actress from Fukuoka Prefecture who is affiliated with Arts Vision. She played her first main role in 2020 as Sally in Bofuri. Her other voice acting roles include Nozomi Nakamura in Tamayomi, Reika Kobato in Deep Insanity: The Lost Child, and Hiyori Hayama in Extreme Hearts.

Filmography

Anime

2015
Sound! Euphonium, Brass band member (episodes 5 and 10)
Wish Upon the Pleiades, Student C (episode 11)

2016
Anne Happy, Pet owner (episode 4), Teacher (episode 1)
Keijo!, Momo Horiuchi (episodes 3 and 4)
Show By Rock!!, Ailane
Myriad Colors Phantom World, Student

2018
Comic Girls, Ruki's mother (episode 4)

2020
Bofuri, Risa Shiromine (Sally)
Tamayomi, Nozomi Nakamura
Hatsune Miku: Colorful Stage!, Ichika Hoshino

2021
Show by Rock!! Stars!!, Ailane
Tropical-Rouge! PreCure, Rika Ichijō
Deep Insanity: The Lost Child, Reika Kobato

2022
Extreme Hearts, Hiyori Hayama

2023
Bofuri 2nd Season, Risa Shiromine (Sally)

References

External links
Agency profile 

1995 births
Arts Vision voice actors
Japanese voice actresses
Living people
Voice actresses from Fukuoka Prefecture